was a feudal domain under the Tokugawa shogunate of Edo period Japan, located in Harima Province in what is now the southwestern portion of modern-day Hyōgo Prefecture. It was centered around the Yamasaki jin'ya which was located in what is now the town of Yamasaki, Hyōgo. It was initially controlled by a cadet branch tozama daimyō Ikeda clan, but later came under the control of a cadet branch of the Honda clan. It was also called

History
In 1615, the 1st daimyō of Okayama Domain, Ikeda Tadatsugu suddenly died at the age of 16 under somewhat suspicious circumstances. His mother, Tokuhime was a daughter of Tokugawa Ieyasu, and she asked that the Tokugawa shogunate separate out the 35,000 koku of his holdings in Harima Province as a separate domain for his younger brother, Ikeda Teruzumi. In 1631, Ikeda Teruzumi added an additional 30,000 koku from his younger brother, Ikeda Teruoki from Ako Domain. However, soon afterwards the domain erupted into a civil war between the two chief karō, Ogawa Shiroemon and Iori Iki. Takebe Masanaga of neighboring Hayashida Domain unsuccessfully attempted an arbitration, and in 1640 the shogunate was forced to directly intervene, ordering the seppuku of 20 senior retainers. Under most circumstances, this would have included Ikeda Teruzumi himself, but since he was a grandson of Tokugawa Ieyasu, he was demoted to a kokudaka of 10,000 koku and reassigned to Shikano Domain in Inaba Province. The Ikeda were replaced by Matsudaira Yasuteru, formerly of Kishiwada Domain. He ruled from 1640 to his transfer to Hamada Domain in 1649. Another cadet branch of the Ikeda clan came to Yamasaki from the Kojima sub-domain of Okayama Domain and riled to 1672, when the line went extinct due to lack of an heir. 

Yamasaki Domain was then assigned to a cadet branch of the Honda clan from the Kōriyama-Shinden sub-domain of Kōriyama Domain of Yamato Province. The Honda ruled until the Meiji restoration. The 8th daimyō Honda Tadachika opened the han school Shisaikan" and made an effort to rebuild the clan's finances. However, after dispatching troops for the First Chōshū expedition in the Bakumatsu period, the clan's finances were ruined, and as a result, it was not possible to dispatch troops to the Second Chōshū expedition.  At the time of the Battle of Toba-Fushimi, the clan refused to participate due to lack of funds. In 1871, with the abolition of the han system, the domain became Yamasaki Prefecture, which was merged with Shikama Prefecture, which in turn became part of Hyogo Prefecture.

The clan was ennobled with the kazoku peerage title of shishaku (viscount) in 1884.

Holdings at the end of the Edo period
As with most domains in the han system, Yamasaki Domain consisted of several discontinuous territories calculated to provide the assigned kokudaka, based on periodic cadastral surveys and projected agricultural yields. 

Harima Province 
34 villages in Shisō District

List of daimyō 

{| class=wikitable
! #||Name || Tenure || Courtesy title || Court Rank || kokudaka 
|-
|colspan=6|  Ikeda clan, 1615-1871 (Tozama)
|-
||1||||1615 - 1640||Iwami-no-kami (石見守); Jijū (侍従)|| Junior 4th Rank, Lower Grade (従四位下)||38,000 -> 68,000 koku
|-
|colspan=6|  Matsui-Matsudaira clan, 1640-1649 (Fudai)
|-
||1||||1640 - 1649||Awa-no-kami (淡路守)|| Junior 5th Rank, Lower Grade (従五位下)||50,000 koku
|-
|colspan=6|  Ikeda clan, 1649-1678 (Tozama)
|-
||1||||1649 - 1671||Bingo-no-kami (備後守)|| Junior 5th Rank, Lower Grade (従五位下)||30,000 koku
|-
||2||||1671 - 1677||Bizen-no-kami (豊前守)|| Junior 5th Rank, Lower Grade (従五位下)||30,000 koku
|-
||3||||1677 - 1678|| -none- || - none - ||30,000 koku
|-
|colspan=6|  Honda clan, 1678-1871 (Fudai)
|-
||1||||1679 - 1718||Higo-no-kami (肥後守)|| Junior 5th Rank, Lower Grade (従五位下)||10,000 koku
|-
||2||||1718 - 1731||Higo-no-kami (肥後守)|| Junior 5th Rank, Lower Grade (従五位下)||10,000 koku
|-
||3||||1731 - 1750||Higo-no-kami (肥後守)|| Junior 5th Rank, Lower Grade (従五位下)||10,000 koku
|-
|4||||1750 - 1761||Yamato-no-kami (大和守)|| Junior 5th Rank, Lower Grade (従五位下)||10,000 koku
|-
|5||||1761 - 1788||Higo-no-kami (肥後守)|| Junior 5th Rank, Lower Grade (従五位下)||10,000 koku
|-
|6||||1788 - 1812||Yamato-no-kami (大和守)|| Junior 5th Rank, Lower Grade (従五位下)||10,000 koku
|-
|7||||1812 - 1834||Higo-no-kami (肥後守)|| Junior 5th Rank, Lower Grade (従五位下)||10,000 koku
|-
|8||||1834 - 1869||Higo-no-kami (肥後守)|| Junior 5th Rank, Lower Grade (従五位下)||10,000 koku
|-
|9||||1869 - 1871||Hizen-no-kami (肥前守)|| 4th Ranke (正四位)||10,000 koku
|-
|}

See also 
 List of Han
 Abolition of the han system

Further reading
 Bolitho, Harold. (1974). Treasures Among Men: The Fudai Daimyo in Tokugawa Japan. New Haven: Yale University Press.  ;  OCLC 185685588

References

Domains of Japan
1871 disestablishments in Japan
States and territories disestablished in 1871
Harima Province
History of Hyōgo Prefecture